The Schwarzbach is a river in southwestern Germany, left tributary of the Blies. Its source is in the Palatinate Forest, near Trippstadt. It flows through the states Rhineland-Palatinate and Saarland. Towns along its course are Waldfischbach-Burgalben, Contwig and Zweibrücken. After , it flows into the Blies in Homburg-Einöd.

Tributaries and course 
The two headwaters of the Schwarzbach, the first  of which is also known as Burgalb, rise on western side of the watershed in the middle of the Palatinate Forest, just south of the hamlet Johanniskreuz, at an altitude of about 500 m. One spring is located on the southern slope of the 528 m high Mount Steinberg.

The river then flows past Leimen into the Schwarzbach valley. Then it flows to Waldfischbach-Burgalben where it takes up the Moosalb from the right. It then flows past Rieschweiler-Mühlbach to Dellfeld, where the Schwarzbach valley ends and the river flows into the Blies valley.
It then flows across the state line into Saarland and into the Blies in Einöd, a district of Homburg, which in turn flows into the Saar  further downstream.

At the confluence, the Schwarzbach carries twice as much water as the Blies ( versus ).  It is also some 10 percent longer.  Since the Blies, in turn, carries slightly more water than the Saar, it could be argued that hydrologically speaking, the Schwarzbach is the main headwater of the Saar river system.

Tourism 
Part of the central Schwarzbach is followed by the German Shoe Road. This holiday route was established in 1977 in order to commemorate that in the early 19th century the region surrounding Pirmasens was the heart of the German shoe industry.

Gallery

See also
List of rivers of Saarland
List of rivers of Rhineland-Palatinate

References

External links 

 Walking in the Schwarzbach area: Tour 40, Tour 56, Tour 61
 Water gauge at Contwig

Rivers of Rhineland-Palatinate
Rivers of Saarland
Rivers and lakes of the Palatinate Forest
Rivers of Germany